The 1973–74 New England Whalers season was the second season of the Whalers' franchise. The Whalers qualified for the playoffs for the second-straight season to attempt to defend their championship. They were defeated in the first round by the Chicago Cougars.

Offseason

Regular season

Final standings

Schedule and results

Playoffs

Chicago Cougars 4, New England Whalers 3 – Division Quarterfinals

Player statistics

Awards and records

Transactions

Draft picks
New England's draft picks at the 1973 WHA Amateur Draft.

Farm teams

See also
1973–74 WHA season

References

External links

New
New
New England Whalers seasons
New England
New England